The 1960–61 Rheinlandliga was the ninth season of the highest amateur class of the Rhineland Football Association under the name of 1. Amateurliga Rheinland. It was a predecessor of today's Rheinlandliga. It was the fifth season in which the league played with two game divisions, East and West. The Rhineland champion was determined through a game between the division champions.

The 1. Amateurliga was below II. Division Southwest until 1963 and therefore the third–class in the hierarchy. In the seasons 1956–57 to 1962–63 the league was played in two divisions (East and West). The two division champions played to determine the Rhineland champion. With the introduction of the regional league Southwest as second highest class, starting in the 1963–64 season, the Amateur league Rheinland was again combined into one division. Beginning in the 1974–75 season, the league played a role as a sub–team to the newly introduced 2. Bundesliga, where the Rhineland champion played in a relegation against the champion of the Verbandsliga Südwest and the Saarlandliga, for a position in the south divisions of the 2. Bundesliga. Starting from the 1978–79 season, the Oberliga Rheinland-Pfalz/Saar was introduced as the highest amateur class and this class was renamed to the "Verbandsliga Rheinland" and since then only fourth class.

Results
Rhineland champion was the winner of the West Division, SV Ehrang, after a victory over the East Division champion, VfB Wissen. The following move up to the II. Division Southwest ended with last place and the team had to remain in the Rheinlandliga.

TuS Diez, SpVgg Neuwied, SV Trier–West and Rheinland Mayen had to move down to the 2. Amateur league.

For the following season 1961−62, promoted from the 2. Amateur league were:
 From the East division: SV Niederbieber, SG Altenkirchen
 From theWest division: SV Leiwen, FV Rübenach

SC 07 Bad Neuenahr and SC Sinzig joined the West division in the next season.

SC Oberlahnstein and FC Urbar moved to the East division in the next season.

East Division

West Division

References

1960 in association football
Football in Rhineland-Palatinate
1961 in association football